Real Madrid CF is a Spanish football club.

Real Madrid may also refer to:

 Real Madrid Baloncesto
 Real Madrid Femenino
 Real Madrid Castilla, the reserve team of Real Madrid football club  
 Real Madrid Baloncesto B, the reserve team of Real Madrid Baloncesto   
 Real Madrid C, Real Madrid former football second reserve team
 Real Madrid CF (youth), the under-19 team of Real Madrid CF
 Real Madrid Voleibol, former volleyball team of the Real Madrid club    
 Real Madrid Balonmano, former handball team of the Real Madrid club   
 Real Madrid Rugby, the rugby union section of the club, closed in 1948
 Ciudad Real Madrid, Real Madrid's training facilities located outside Madrid in Valdebebas 
 Real Madrid TV, an encrypted Digital television channel, operated by Real Madrid, for the Real Madrid football club
 Real Madrid Fantasy Manager, a football club management game developed by From The Bench. The game has been designed according to the theme of Real Madrid CF
 Real Madrid Resort Island, proposed sports and amusement park planned by Real Madrid on Marjan Island